Antonio Quintero (born 20 September 1961) is a Cuban former cyclist. He competed in the individual road race event at the 1980 Summer Olympics.

References

External links
 

1961 births
Living people
Cuban male cyclists
Olympic cyclists of Cuba
Cyclists at the 1980 Summer Olympics
Sportspeople from Havana